Starlight Stadium (formerly Westhills Stadium) is a 6,000 seat multi-purpose stadium in Langford, British Columbia, Canada. It is used by Pacific FC of the Canadian Premier League for soccer, by Rugby Canada for various events, and by the Westshore Rebels junior Canadian football team. In an international context, its most notable usage is as the site of the Canada Women's Sevens, an event in the World Rugby Women's Sevens Series for national rugby sevens teams. The stadium also hosted the BC Bears of the Canadian Rugby Championship from 2009 to 2013, and the Victoria Highlanders soccer team from 2009 to 2011.

The main stadium seats 6,000 and has 18 VIP suites, four change rooms, officials' rooms, concession, storage, and public washrooms. The field is built to FIFA 2-Star and World Rugby specifications, able to accommodate soccer, football, and rugby matches. Before expansion in 2019, the stadium had 1,600 permanent seats.

Secondary field

This second full-sized field is also FIFA 2-Star rated and can accommodate the Canadian Rugby Association football codes.

History

Starlight Stadium at City Centre Park was opened in 2009 as Bear Mountain Stadium. On September 29, 2012, the name was changed to Westhills Stadium after a land development company.

On July 20, 2018, It was first announced that Westhills would host Pacific FC of the Canadian Premier League beginning in 2019. The stadium underwent renovations to increase capacity to 6,000 and provide additional amenities.

On March 27 and 31, 2020, the Canadian men's national soccer team was scheduled to play two friendly matches against Trinidad and Tobago at Westhills. On March 13, 2020, these matches were cancelled due to the COVID-19 pandemic in Canada.

In April 2021, the stadium was renamed to Starlight Stadium after a five-year naming rights deal.

Rugby union

See also
 List of Canadian Premier League stadiums

References

External links
 Starlight Stadium at Langford.ca
 Amenities, transportation and park rules at citycentrepark.ca

Sports venues in British Columbia
Greater Victoria
Soccer venues in British Columbia
Multi-purpose stadiums in British Columbia
Rugby union stadiums in British Columbia
Pacific FC
Canadian Premier League stadiums
Sports venues completed in 2009
2009 establishments in British Columbia